Ascall mac Ragnaill meic Torcaill (died 16 May 1171), also known as Ascall Mac Torcaill, was the last Norse-Gaelic king of Dublin. He was a member of the Meic Torcaill, a Dublin family of significance since the early twelfth century.

Control of the wealthy coastal kingdom was bitterly contested during Ascall's floruit, with members of his immediate family, as well as Islesmen and Irishmen, all securing power for brief periods of time. Throughout much of this period, however, the overlord of Dublin was Diarmait Mac Murchada, King of Leinster. In 1166, after the death of his close ally Muirchertach Mac Lochlainn, High King of Ireland, Mac Murchada was beset by his enemies. At this critical point of his reign, Mac Murchada lost the support of the Dubliners, which contributed to his expulsion from Ireland that year. Not long afterwards, however, he made his return with significant military assistance from mercenary English adventurers. In the latter half of 1170, Dublin itself fell to the combined forces of Mac Murchada and the powerful English magnate Richard de Clare, Earl of Pembroke.

With the collapse of the Norse-Gaelic kingdom, Ascall and the Dublin elite were forced to flee into what one source calls the "northern islands", a reference to either the Kingdom of the Isles or the Earldom of Orkney. About a year later, not long after Mac Murchada's death, Ascall attempted to regain his patrimony from the English. Unfortunately for himself, his invasion of Dublin ended in utter failure, and he was executed by the English governor of the town. Immediately following his fall, Dublin was besieged by a combined force of Irishmen and Islesmen. The town, however, remained firmly in the hands of the English; and before the end of the year, Dublin passed into the direct control of Henry II, King of England, who converted it into an English royal town.

Background

Ascall's father was Ragnall mac Torcaill, a man who may well have ruled as King of Dublin. The men were members of the Meic Torcaill, a substantial landholding kindred in the kingdom. Several members of this Norse-Gaelic family held the kingship in the twelfth century. One such man was Ascall's uncle, Brodar mac Torcaill, King of Dublin, who was slain in 1160.

At the midpoint of the twelfth century, the kingdom was under the overlordship of Diarmait Mac Murchada, King of Leinster. The latter's ultimate overking, however, was Muirchertach Mac Lochlainn, King of Cenél nEógain. The year after Brodar's death, numerous sources indicate that Mac Murchada, with a force of Dubliners in tow, formally rendered submission to Mac Lochlainn. In 1162, the fifteenth- to sixteenth-century Annals of Ulster reveals that Mac Murchada gained an almost-unprecedented authority over Dublin. There is reason to suspect that his success stemmed from assistance received from Mac Lochlainn. The latter, for example, is recorded by the same source to have laid siege to the town within the year. This military campaign may have been undertaken to counter the Dubliners' attempt to install Gofraid mac Amlaíb, King of the Isles to the kingship of Dublin, as recounted by the thirteenth- to fourteenth-century Chronicle of Mann.

The record of events during the mid part of the twelfth century suggests that Leinster-based overkings of Dublin enjoyed the cooperation of the indigenous leaders of Dublin, and the emergence of the Meic Torcaill during this period may well fit into such a context. When an indigenous ruler was not to be found, however, the Dubliners seem to have sought leadership from the Isles, rather than endure a non-Leinster overking, as evidenced by the attempt to install Gofraid. Mac Murchada's considerable authority in Dublin at this point is evidenced by several ecclesiastical grants, foundations, and appointments. Furthermore, two major military operations undertaken by Dublin's forces in 1164 and 1165 may have been conducted under Mac Murchada's authority. The latter campaign, recorded by the Annals of Ulster, and the thirteenth- and fourteenth-century texts Brut y Tywysogyon and Brenhinedd y Saesson, concerned naval manoeuvres off Wales, in the service of Henry II, King of England. The former campaign, recorded by the Annals of Ulster, consisted of involvement in the ill-fated invasion of mainland Scotland, launched by Somairle mac Gilla Brigte, King of the Isles.

Fall of Mac Murchada and rise of Ua Conchobair

Mac Lochlainn was slain in 1166, leaving Mac Murchada to fend off his own enemies alone. Other than Mac Murchada himself, another man making a bid for the high-kingship was Ruaidrí Ua Conchobair, King of Connacht. Within the same year as Mac Lochlainn's demise, Ua Conchobair and his allies expulsed Mac Murchada from not only Dublin, but Ireland altogether. As such, Ua Conchobair was duly recognised as High King of Ireland.

According to the seventeenth-century Annals of the Four Masters, he had secured the cooperation of Dublin, and perhaps gained the kingship of the town itself, through a stipend of 4,000 cows. In consequence, Dubliners formed part of Ua Conchobair's forces when he marched to Drogheda and Leinster, where he forced the submissions of the kings of Airgialla and Leinster respectively. In fact, Dublin appears to have formed a key part of Ua Conchobair's arsenal, and it is apparent that Mac Murchada was doomed without the support of this coastal-kingdom. Certainly, the twelfth- to thirteenth-century La Geste des Engleis en Yrlande relates that Ascall ("MacTurkyl de Diveline") had abandoned his former overlord, and the eleventh- to fourteenth-century Annals of Inisfallen specify that Mac Murchada was only expulsed from Ireland after the Leinstermen and Dubliners had turned against him. Although Ua Conchobair appears to have allowed Mac Murchada to retain his patrimonial lordship of Uí Chennselaig, the Annals of the Four Masters reveals that the Leinstermen and Dubliners assisted Tigernán Ua Ruairc, King of Bréifne in forcing Mac Murchada from this final vestige of authority and into exile.

The following year, Ua Conchobair convened a great assembly at Athboy. The Annals of the Four Masters states that 13,000 horsemen attended the meeting — 1,000 of which were supplied from Dublin. One of the many rulers recorded to have attended this gathering is a certain Ragnall mac Ragnaill, styled  ("lord of the foreigners"). The latter's name and title suggest that he was either an otherwise unattested brother of Ascall, or else an annalist's mistake for Ascall himself. 

Meanwhile, after his expulsion from Ireland, Mac Murchada sought out Henry on the Continent, and gained permission to recruit military aid from the latter's subjects. In the autumn of 1167, Mac Murchada and his English allies arrived in Ireland, where they established themselves at Ferns. Ua Conchobair responded by penetrating Uí Chennselaig in a campaign, recounted by the fourteenth-century Annals of Tigernach, that included military support from Dublin. With Mac Murchada temporally kept in check, a preoccupied Ua Conchobair allowed him to hold onto at least part of his patrimony.

Arrival of the English and Dublin's fall

The situation in Ireland remained relatively unchanged until the arrival of a significant force of mercenaries in the summer of 1169, after which some of Mac Murchada's former vassals began to come over to his side. According to La Geste des Engleis en Yrlande, however, the kings of Uí Fáeláin and Osraige, and Ascall—described by this source as the "lord" of Dublin—stubbornly refused to support Mac Murchada's cause. In an apparent show of force that may have been designed to keep the Dubliners onside, the Annals of the Four Masters states that Ua Conchobair led an army to Tara, where he was joined by the forces of the kings of Ulaid and Airgialla, after which the combined army marched upon Dublin. The following year, however, saw the arrival of even more English support for Mac Murchada; and in August 1170, Richard de Clare, Earl of Pembroke landed in Ireland and took Waterford by storm. 

Soon after, Clare married Mac Murchada's daughter, Aoife (or Aífe), and effectively became heir to kingship of Leinster and the overlordship of Dublin. Unsurprisingly, later in September, the combined forces of Mac Murchada and Clare marched on Dublin, where they confronted Ua Conchobair and his forces.

If the account of the Annals of the Four Masters is to be believed, the Dubliners switched sides at this point, deserted the cause of Ua Conchobair, and further suffered an act of divine justice as their town went up in flames. On the other hand, the twelfth-century Expugnatio Hibernica specifies that, whilst negotiations were under way between the forces of Ua Conchobair and the coalition of Mac Murchada and Clare, an English force under the command of Miles de Cogan and Raymond le Gros successfully assaulted the town, and caused considerable carnage amongst the inhabitants. Although the Annals of the Four Masters specifies that the Dubliners were slaughtered in their fortress, after which the English carried off their cattle and goods, Expugnatio Hibernica instead states that the majority of the Dubliners escaped the massacre and retained most of their possessions. The same source states that Ascall and the Dubliners managed to escape into the "northern islands". This term could well refer to Orkney. On the other hand, it is also possible that the term refers to the Hebrides or Mann; if so, this source would appear to be evidence that the Dubliners had retained close links with the Isles. According to the version of events preserved by La Geste des Engleis en Yrlande, the coalition's conquest of Dublin took place on 21 September.

Final defeat and death

Within weeks of Mac Murchada's death at the beginning of May, Expugnatio Hibernica reveals that Ascall made his return to Dublin. The account of events recorded by Expugnatio Hibernica and La Geste des Engleis en Yrlande indicate that Ascall's forces consisted of heavily armoured Islesmen and Norwegians. The former source numbers Ascall's forces at sixty ships, whilst the latter gives one hundred. According to both sources, Ascall's followers included a notable warrior named "John the Mad", a figure who may or may not be identical to the Orcadian saga-character Sveinn Ásleifarson.

According to La Geste des Engleis en Yrlande, the invaders made landfall at the "Steine", located on the southern bank of the River Liffey, and proceeded to encamp themselves outside the town's walls. Expugnatio Hibernica relates that they assaulted the walls of the eastern gate, a location that corresponds to St Mary's Gate, the focus of assault identified by La Geste des Engleis en Yrlande. Unfortunately for Ascall, the operation was an utter failure that resulted in his capture and death. Both sources relate that the town's defenders, led by Cogan and his brother Richard, successfully repulsed the invaders, slew John, and captured Ascall as he fled to his fleet. Although Expugnatio Hibernica reveals that Ascall's life had originally been reserved for ransom, both this source, and La Geste des Engleis en Yrlande, report that he was soon beheaded on account of his recalcitrance.

The successive deaths of Mac Murchada and Ascall appear to have left a power vacuum in Dublin that others strived to fill. Immediately after Ascall's fall, Ua Conchobair had the English-controlled town besieged. Expugnatio Hibernica records that he and Lorcán Ua Tuathail, Archbishop of Dublin sent for Gofraid and others in the Isles, asking them to blockade Dublin by sea. According to the aforesaid source, "the threat of English domination, inspired by the successes of the English, made the men of the Isles act all the more quickly, and with the wind in the north-west they immediately sailed about thirty ships full of warriors into the harbour of the Liffey". Unfortunately for the Irish, Islesmen, and Dubliners, the blockade was ultimately a failure, and Dublin remained firmly in the hands of the English. Ascall was the last Norse-Gaelic King of Dublin. Before the end of the year, Clare relinquished possession to his own liege lord, Henry, who converted it into an English royal town.

There is evidence post-dating Ascall's fall revealing that he gifted the church of St Brigid, and its surrounding lands, to the priory of the Holy Trinity (Christ Church Cathedral). A  or —Gaelic and Old Norse terms for a peasant settlement—is stated to have belonged to Ascall by Dublin's western gate.

Notes

Citations

References

Primary sources

Secondary sources

|-

1171 deaths
12th-century Irish monarchs
Executed Irish people
Executed royalty
Meic Torcaill
Monarchs of Dublin
People executed under the Plantagenets by decapitation
Year of birth unknown